Abortion in the U.S. state of Virginia is legal up to the end of the second trimester of a pregnancy. 55% of adults said in a poll by the Pew Research Center that abortion should be legal in all or most cases. Abortion was illegal in Virginia by 1900, but by 1950 had a legal therapeutic exception. At the University of Virginia Hospital in 1950, a review board was created to examine and approve all abortion requests that were approved for psychiatric reasons which resulted in a large drop in the number of abortions performed there. In the 1975 Bigelow v. Virginia case the US Supreme Court ruled that state bans on abortion clinics advertising their services were unconstitutional. By 2007, Virginia had an abortion-specific informed consent requirement. The number of abortion clinics in Virginia has fluctuated over the years, with 71 in 1982, 64 in 1992 and eighteen in 2014. There were 20,187 legal abortions in 2014, and 18,663 in 2015. There are active abortion rights and anti-abortion rights activist communities in the states. The state has also seen anti-abortion rights violence, including at least two arson attacks.

History 
The University of Virginia created a review board in 1950 to examine and approve all abortion requests that were approved for psychiatric reasons. This had the impact of reducing the number of abortions performed at its facility to one in 1951.

Legislative history 
By the end of the 1800s, all states in the Union except Louisiana had therapeutic exceptions in their legislative bans on abortions. In the 19th century, bans by state legislatures on abortion were about protecting the life of the mother given the number of deaths caused by abortions; state governments saw themselves as looking out for the lives of their citizens.

In 1970 Virginia reformed their abortion laws based on the American Law Institute Model Penal Code.

The state was one of 23 states in 2007 to have a detailed abortion-specific informed consent requirement. In 2013, state Targeted Regulation of Abortion Providers (TRAP) law applied to medication induced abortions and private doctor offices in addition to abortion clinics. In mid-May 2019, state law banned abortion after week 25. On April 10, 2020, Democratic Virginia Governor Ralph Northam signed bills removing regulations that had required abortion seekers to have an ultrasound at least 24 hours before receiving an abortion and to get counseling on alternatives to abortion, removing the requirement that facilities providing more than five abortions each year be designated as hospitals, and allowing nurse practitioners to perform first trimester abortions. 

Currently, abortion is banned from the start of the third trimester, which begins in week 28 or 29 of a pregnancy. Third-trimester abortions, which must be certified by a physician, are only allowed if continued pregnancy is found to pose an imminent danger to a woman's life. In order for a patient to terminate a pregnancy in the third trimester, three doctors must certify that continuing the pregnancy would likely cause the patient’s death or “substantially and irremediably impair” her mental or physical health. In addition, State Medicaid coverage of abortion care is banned except in very limited circumstances, parental consent or notice is required for a minor's abortion, and qualified health care professionals, not solely physicians, can provide abortions.

Judicial history 
The US Supreme Court's decision in 1973's Roe v. Wade ruling meant the state could no longer regulate abortion in the first trimester.  (However, the Supreme Court overturned Roe v. Wade in Dobbs v. Jackson Women's Health Organization,  later in 2022.)

The Bigelow v. Virginia case was decided by the US Supreme Court in 1975. The court ruled that state bans on abortion clinics advertising their services were unconstitutional as they violated freedom of speech and freedom of the press.

Clinic history 

Between 1982 and 1992, the number of abortion clinics in the state declined by seventeen, going from 81 in 1982 to 64 in 1992. In 2014, there were eighteen abortion clinics in the state. In 2014, 92% of the counties in the state did not have an abortion clinic. That year, 78% of women in the state aged 15–44 lived in a county without an abortion clinic. In 2017, there were five Planned Parenthood clinics, of which four offered abortion services, in a state with a population of 1,971,590 women aged 15–49.

On May 9, 2007, an unidentified person deliberately set fire to a Planned Parenthood clinic in Virginia Beach, Virginia.

Statistics 
In the period between 1972 and 1974, the state had an illegal abortion mortality rate per million women aged 15–44 of between 0.1 and 0.9. In 1990, 745,000 women in the state faced the risk of an unintended pregnancy. In 2010, the state had two federally funded abortions. In 2013, among white women aged 15–19, there were 1,090 abortions, 1,280 abortions for black women aged 15–19, 250 abortions for Hispanic women aged 15–19, and 190 abortions for women of all other races. In 2014, 55% of adults said in a poll by the Pew Research Center that abortion should be legal in all or most cases. In 2017, the state had an infant mortality rate of 5.9 deaths per 1,000 live births.

Abortion rights views and activities

Protests 
Women from the state participated in marches supporting abortion rights as part of a #StoptheBans movement in May 2019.

Anti-abortion views and activities

Organizations 
Virginia Society for Human Life (VSHL), a nonprofit organization advocating an end to abortion in Virginia and is the oldest pro-life organization in the US.

Violence 
1982 saw a surge in attacks on abortion clinics in the United States with at least four arson attacks and one bombing.  One attack occurred in Illinois and one in Virginia.  Two occurred in Florida.  These five attacks caused over $1.1 million in damage. On May 26, 1983, Joseph Grace set the Hillcrest clinic in Norfolk, Virginia, ablaze. He was arrested while sleeping in his van a few blocks from the clinic when a patrol officer noticed the smell of kerosene. Between this attack and one in Washington, over $500,000 in damage was done to the two clinics.

References 

 
Virginia
Healthcare in Virginia
Women in Virginia